The Moldovan Chess Championship has been contested every year since 1944. Since 1949 a separate women's championship has also been held in most years. Both championships are currently held under the auspices of the Moldova Chess Federation, which was founded on 2 November 1994.

Open championship winners

{| class="sortable wikitable"
! Year !! Champion
|-
| 1944 || Vasily Veter
|-
| 1945 || V. Uveatkin
|-
| 1946 || V. Uveatkin
|-
| 1947 || Vitaly Tarasov
|-
| 1948 || Vitaly Tarasov
|-
| 1949 || Vitaly Tarasov
|-
| 1950 || Vitaly Tarasov
|-
| 1951 || Vitaly Tarasov
|-
| 1952 || Mikhail Shofman
|-
| 1953 || M. Regenbogen
|-
| 1954 || Shlomo Giterman
|-
| 1955 || Vitaly Tarasov
|-
| 1956 || Shlomo Giterman
|-
| 1957 || Shlomo Giterman
|-
| 1958 || Samuel Zhukhovitsky
|-
| 1959 || Samuel Zhukhovitsky
|-
| 1960 || Shlomo Giterman
|-
| 1961 || Ilya Mosionzhik
|-
| 1962 || Mikhail Shofman
|-
| 1963 || Anatoly Lutikov
|-
| 1964 || Anatoly Lutikov
|-
| 1965 || Anatoly Lutikov
|-
| 1966 || Anatoly Lutikov
|-
| 1967 || Boris Nevednichy
|-
| 1968 || Anatoly Lutikov
|-
| 1969 || Mikhail Shofman
|-
| 1970 || Ilye Figler, Lazar Shusterman
|-
| 1971 || Boris Nevednichy
|-
| 1972 ||Nikolay Popov
|-
| 1973 || Boris Nevednichy
|-
| 1974 || Nikolay Popov
|-
| 1975 || Nikolay Popov
|-
| 1976 || Nikolay Popov
|-
| 1977 || Anatoly Lutikov
|-
| 1978 || Orest Averkin
|-
| 1979 || Vladimir Alterman
|-
| 1980 || Boris Itkis
|-
| 1981 || Wladimir Skulener
|-
| 1982 || Boris Itkis
|-
| 1983 || Boris Itkis
|-
| 1984 || Boris Itkis
|-
| 1985 || Boris Nevednichy
|-
| 1986 || Georgi Orlov
|-
| 1987 || Boris Nevednichy
|-
| 1988 || German Titov
|- 
| 1989 || Georgi Orlov
|-
| 1990 || Boris Itkis
|-
| 1991 || Ilye Figler
|-
| 1992 || Boris Itkis
|- 
| 1993 || Boris Nevednichy
|-
| 1994 || Dorian Rogozenko
|- 
| 1995 || Boris Nevednichy
|-
| 1996 || Vadim Chernov
|-
| 1997 || Boris Itkis
|- 
| 1998 || Vasile Sanduleac
|-
| 1999 || Anatolij Bets
|-
| 2000 || Dmitry Svetushkin
|-
| 2001 || Vasile Sanduleac
|-
| 2002 || Alexei Furtuna
|-
| 2003 || Vasile Sanduleac
|-
| 2004 || Alexey Khruschiov
|-
| 2005 || Svetlana Petrenko
|-
| 2006 || Viacheslav Slovineanu
|-
| 2007 || Vasile Sanduleac
|-
| 2008 || Vasile Sanduleac
|-
| 2009 || Serghei Vedmediuc
|-
| 2010 || Vladimir Hamițevici
|-
| 2011 || Serghei Vedmediuc
|-
| 2012 || Iulian Baltag
|-
| 2013 || Dan Golub
|-
| 2014 || Liviu Cerbulenco
|-
| 2015 || Ruslan Soltanici
|-
| 2016 || Viorel Iordăchescu
|-
| 2017 || Nichita Morozov
|-
| 2018 || Vladimir Hamițevici
|-
| 2019 || Andrei Macovei
|-
| 2020 || Iulian Baltag
|-
| 2021 || Iulian Baltag
|-
| 2022 || Dragoș Cereș
|}

Women's championship winners

{| class="sortable wikitable"
! Year !! Champion
|-
| 1949 ||Dekabrina Kazatsker
|-
| 1950 || N. Tarasova
|-
| 1951 || Natasha Kolotyi, Dekabrina Kazatsker
|-
| 1952 ||Dekabrina Kazatsker
|-
| 1953 ||Natasha Kolotyi
|-
| 1954 || E. Matos
|-
| 1955 ||Natasha Kolotyi
|-
| 1956 || N. Kononova
|-
| 1959 || Bronislava Mosionzhik
|-
| 1960 ||Bronislava Mosionzhik
|-
| 1961 ||Bronislava Mosionzhik
|-
| 1962 ||Bronislava Mosionzhik
|-
| 1963 ||Bronislava Mosionzhik
|-
| 1964 ||Bronislava Mosionzhik
|-
| 1965 ||Bronislava Mosionzhik
|-
| 1967 || Natalia Ivanova, Bronislava Mosionzhik
|-
| 1968 ||Bronislava Mosionzhik
|-
| 1970 ||Bronislava Mosionzhik
|-
| 1971 || Raisa Nevednichaya
|-
| 1972 ||Raisa Nevednichaya
|-
| 1973 ||Bronislava Mosionzhik
|-
| 1974 ||Raisa Nevednichaya
|-
| 1975 || Alla Grinfeld
|-
| 1976 || Ludmila Saunina
|-
| 1977 || Naira Agababean
|-
| 1978 || Marina Afanasova
|-
| 1979 ||Raisa Nevednichaya
|-
| 1980 ||Naira Agababean
|-
| 1981 ||Naira Agababean
|-
| 1982 ||Naira Agababean
|-
| 1983 ||Naira Agababean
|-
| 1984 ||Naira Agababean
|-
| 1985 || Polina Zilberman
|-
| 1986 ||Polina Zilberman
|-
| 1987 || Marina Sheremetieva (née Afanasova)
|-
| 1988 ||Marina Sheremetieva
|- 
| 1989 || Irina Brandis
|-
| 1990 || Nadejda Roizen
|-
| 1991 ||Irina Brandis
|-
| 1992 ||Marina Sheremetieva
|- 
| 1993 || Svetlana Petrenko
|-
| 1994 ||Naira Agababean
|- 
| 1995 || Anna Shusterman
|-
| 1996 ||Naira Agababean
|-
| 1997 || Karolina Smokina
|- 
| 1998 ||Svetlana Petrenko
|-
| 1999 ||Svetlana Petrenko
|-
| 2000 ||Anna Shusterman, Svetlana Petrenko
|-
| 2001 ||Svetlana Petrenko
|-
| 2002 || Elena Partac
|-
| 2003 ||Elena Partac
|-
| 2004 ||Anna Shusterman
|-
| 2005 || Lilia Doibani
|-
| 2006 ||Elena Partac
|-
| 2007 || Irina Bulmaga
|-
| 2008 ||Irina Bulmaga
|-
| 2009 || Diana Baciu
|-
| 2010 || Elena Partac
|-
| 2011 || Olga Hincu
|-
| 2012 ||Svetlana Petrenko
|-
| 2013 ||Svetlana Petrenko
|-
| 2014 || Paula-Alexandra Gitu
|-
| 2015 ||Svetlana Petrenko
|-
| 2016 ||Svetlana Petrenko
|-
| 2017 ||Svetlana Petrenko
|-
| 2018 ||Svetlana Petrenko
|-
| 2019 ||Svetlana Petrenko
|-
| 2020 ||Valentina Verbin
|-
| 2021 ||Svetlana Petrenko
|-
| 2022 ||Ana Petricenco
|-
|}

References

Chess national championships
Women's chess national championships
Chess in Moldova
Chess